Zorawar Fort is a fort in Leh, Ladakh, India built in 1836 for Wazir Zorawar Singh Kahluria, a military general of Dogra Rajput ruler Gulab Singh. The fort once kept the wealth of the rulers of the Dogra dynasty and a museum at the fort currently preserves treasures of the rulers as well as coins and postage stamps. 

General Zorawar Singh was admired as a military genius and a master of mountain warfare. During his time (between 1834 and 1841) as General he visited Ladakh up to six times and extended Ladakh's boundaries in the north. General Zorawar was referred as Napolean of India, this fort is to commemorate his sincerity, loyalty and bravery.

Thanks to General Zorawar Singh when India gained Independence from British in 1947, Ladakh and Baltistan became part of the new republic.

Indian Army created a museum and sound and light show in the fort as renovation and restoration in 2006.

This fort is on Skara Road, Leh, and is only about 7 minutes from Leh Palace.

How to Reach

By Road 
Leh-Srinagar National Highway (known as National Highway 1D) and Leh-Manali Highway are two ways to reach Leh. However, these routes are available only during Summer months. 

J&K Road Transport provides provides public transport options from Srinagar to Leh (434Kms) which takes two days and Himachal Road Transport Corporation provides bus services from Manali to Leh (474Kms) which takes about 20hours.

By Air 
Leh Airport is the nearest airport and in winter months this is the only way to reach here.

By Train 
No Train transport options available.

References

Forts in India
Leh district
Ladakh
Tourism
Tourism in Ladakh